Servino is an Italian surname. Notable people with the name include:

Francesco Servino (born 1984), Italian journalist
Jean-Luc Servino (born 1989), Italian director and writer

See also
Sorvino, surname

Italian-language surnames